The Centro Cultural Banco do Brasil (CCBB, in English: Bank of Brazil Cultural Center) is a cultural organization of the Bank of Brazil based in Brazil with centers in Belo Horizonte, Brasília, Rio de Janeiro and São Paulo.

The CCBB began in 1986. It opened in Rio de Janeiro in 1989, Brasília in 2000, São Paulo in 2001 and Belo Horizonte in 2013. Its three centers in Rio de Janeiro, Brasilia, and São Paulo are among the top hundred most visited art museums in the world. In 2013, the three centers combined had 4.4 million visitors: 2,034,397 visitors in Rio de Janeiro, 1,468,818 visitors in Brasília, and 931,639 visitors in São Paulo.

The largest of the CCBB institutions is located in Rio de Janeiro, in an Art Deco building designed by Francisco Joaquim Bethencourt da Silva. Similar in size is the São Paulo institution, designed in the same style by Hippolyto Pujol. The smallest of the three complexes is the Brasília branch, designed by Alba Rabelo Cunha. Both the Rio de Janeiro and São Paulo branches contain theatres, cinemas, and multiple art galleries.

Gallery

See also 
 Cultural center
 CAIXA Cultural São Paulo

References

External links 
  (in Portuguese)

1986 establishments in Brazil
Art museums and galleries in Brazil
Cultural centers in Brazil
Museums established in 1989
Museums in Brasília
Museums in Rio de Janeiro (city)
Museums in São Paulo
Arts organisations based in Brazil
Organizations established in 1986